The Democratic Party of Ivory Coast – African Democratic Rally (abbreviated PDCI-RDA) is a centre-right political party in Ivory Coast.

History
Founded during the colonial era in 1946, as an outgrowth of the African Agricultural Union, it became the only legal party in the country upon independence in 1960.  For the next 30 years, the PDCI and the government were effectively one.  Every five years, its founder and leader, Félix Houphouët-Boigny, was automatically elected to a five-year term as president of the republic and confirmed in office via a referendum.  At the same time, a single list of PDCI candidates was returned to the National Assembly.

All adult Ivorians were required to be members of the party, which was considered the primary intermediary between the government and the people.  Even after opposition parties were legalised in 1990, the PDCI continued to dominate Ivorian politics. At the 1990 elections, Houphouët-Boigny was reelected with an implausible 81 percent of the vote, and the party won all but 12 seats in the legislature.

Houphouët-Boigny led the party from its formation until his death in 1993. A year later, acting president of the republic Henri Konan Bédié became the party's second leader. He served out Houphouët-Boigny's seventh term, and was elected in his own right in 1995 with over 96 percent of the vote; the opposition parties had boycotted the election in protest of new eligibility requirements that they deemed unfair. The party lost power when Bédié was ousted in a December 1999 coup.

The PDCI announced in early 2000 that it would hold a congress to choose new leadership, and Bédié denounced this as a "putsch"; the party decided to retain Bédié in the leadership, however. In August, Bédié and four other PDCI members registered as candidates in the October 2000 presidential election; shortly afterward, Emile Constant Bombet, who had served as Interior Minister under Bédié, defeated Bédié for the PDCI presidential nomination. Bombet and Bédié were both barred from running by the Constitutional Court in early October, and on October 10 Bédié called for a boycott of the election.

Unlike many former single parties in Africa, the PDCI has made a good account of itself since losing power.  In the parliamentary election held on 10 December 2000 and 14 January 2001, the party won 94 out of 225 seats.

On 18 May 2005, the PDCI and the Rally of the Republicans (RDR), despite a history of hostility towards one another (the RDR had been formed as a liberal splinter from the PDCI in 1994), signed an agreement to form a coalition, the Rally of Houphouëtists for Democracy and Peace, along with two smaller parties, the Union for Democracy and Peace in Ivory Coast (UDPCI) and the Movement of the Forces of the Future (MFA), ahead of the presidential election then planned for October 2005. This election was delayed several times, finally held in 2010.  By that time, the two parties had resumed competing against each other.

At the 11 December 2011 parliamentary election, the PDCI remained the principal opposition party, with 76 seats.

At the 2016 parliamentary election, the Rally of Houphouëtists for Democracy and Peace (composed of the RDR, the PDCI and some minor parties) won a strong majority at the National Assembly.

Electoral history

Presidential elections

National Assembly elections

See also 
 Eburnean Democratic Bloc, splinter group formed in 1949 
 Youth of the African Democratic Rally of Ivory Coast
 Patrick Achi

References

External links
PDCI-RDA website 
PDCI-RDA website 

1946 establishments in Ivory Coast
African and Black nationalist parties in Africa
Conservative parties in Africa
Pan-Africanism in Ivory Coast
Pan-Africanist political parties in Africa
Parties of one-party systems
Political parties established in 1946
Political parties in Ivory Coast
Populist parties
Sections of the Rassemblement Démocratique Africain